Mark Gregory Ryan (born January 21, 1957) is an American former professional soccer player who played as a defender in the North American Soccer League and Major Indoor Soccer League.  He was the head coach of the United States women's national soccer team from 2005 to 2007.  He was previously the head coach at University of Wisconsin–Madison, Southern Methodist University, and Colorado College, and was an assistant with the national team.

In 1983, Ryan entered the coaching ranks, while still playing, when he served as an assistant coach with Colorado College men's soccer team. Ryan retired from playing after the first MISL season of the Sting in 1985 and moved to the University of Wisconsin–Madison where he coached in various capacities until 1993. In 1991, he was named the women's college coach of the year.  In 1996, he moved to Southern Methodist University where he compiled a 37–21–5 record as the women's soccer coach.  In 1999, he moved back to Colorado College.

The national team finished first in first-round group play in the 2007 Women's World Cup held in China. In the quarterfinals, the team defeated England 3–0. Heading into the semifinal match against Brazil, Ryan decided to bench regular goalkeeper Hope Solo in favor of veteran goalkeeper Briana Scurry. The team subsequently lost to Brazil 0–4 (the worst defeat in the team's history) and Ryan received considerable criticism for the sudden lineup change as well as defensive-minded substitutions made when the team arguably needed more offensive players to compete against the Brazilians.  On Monday, October 22, 2007, U.S. Soccer President Sunil Gulati announced that Ryan's contract would not be extended past its December 31, 2007 expiration date.

Ryan accepted the position of head coach for the University of Michigan women's soccer team on Feb. 1, 2008. He became the second head coach in the program's 14-year history.  After the team posted losing seasons in his first two years at the helm, the Michigan women's team qualified for the NCAA tournament in 2010 but lost in the first round.  In 2012, they advanced to the Sweet Sixteen, and in 2013, they made it to the Elite Eight.  Through seven seasons at Michigan, Ryan's record is 75–46–23. After the 2018 season, Michigan and Ryan parted ways.

Coaching record

References

External links
 NCAA coaching records
 SoccerPlayers.com interview with Ryan
 NASL/MISL stats

1957 births
Living people
American soccer coaches
American soccer players
Chicago Sting (MISL) players
Chicago Sting (NASL) players
North American Soccer League (1968–1984) indoor players
North American Soccer League (1968–1984) players
Minnesota Kicks players
College women's soccer coaches in the United States
SMU Mustangs men's soccer players
Tulsa Roughnecks (1978–1984) players
New York Cosmos players
United States women's national soccer team managers
2007 FIFA Women's World Cup managers
German emigrants to the United States
Footballers from Frankfurt
Michigan Wolverines women's soccer coaches
American women's soccer coaches
Association football defenders
Wisconsin Badgers women's soccer coaches
SMU Mustangs women's soccer coaches
All-American men's college soccer players